Caenibius tardaugens is an oestradiol-degrading bacterium from the family Hyphomicrobiaceae which has been isolated from activated sludge from a sewage treatment plant in Japan.

References

External links
Type strain of Novosphingobium tardaugens at BacDive -  the Bacterial Diversity Metadatabase	

Bacteria described in 2003
Hyphomicrobiales